Euapta is a genus of sea cucumbers in the family Synaptidae.

Species
The World Register of Marine Species lists the following species :

Euapta godeffroyi  (Semper, 1868)
Euapta lappa  (J. Müller, 1850)
Euapta magna  Heding, 1928
Euapta tahitiensis  Cherbonnier, 1955

References

Holothuroidea genera
Synaptidae